Krepost, Haskovo Province is a village in the municipality of Dimitrovgrad, in Haskovo Province, in southern Bulgaria.

Nomenclature 

Krepost (Bulgarian: Крепост) is named after the Bulgarian word of the same name, meaning keep or fort.

References
2.  Translate 

Villages in Haskovo Province